Émilie Loit was the defending champion, but chose not to participate that year.

Flavia Pennetta won in the final 6–0, 4–6, 6–1, against Alizé Cornet.

Seeds

Draw

Finals

Top half

Bottom half

Qualifying

Qualifying seeds

Qualifiers

Qualifying draw

First qualifier

Second qualifier

Third qualifier

Fourth qualifier

External links
Official results archive (ITF)
Official results archive (WTA)

2008 Abierto Mexicano Telcel
Abierto Mexicano Telcel